Paul Anthony Gigot (born May 24, 1955) is an American Pulitzer Prize–winning conservative political commentator and editor of the editorial pages for The Wall Street Journal.  He is also the moderator of the public affairs television series Journal Editorial Report, a program reflecting the Journals editorial views which airs on Fox News Channel.

Early life
Paul Gigot was born in San Antonio, Texas, and he and his family moved to Green Bay, Wisconsin, not long afterward. He is Roman Catholic and attended Catholic schools for 12 years. He graduated from Abbot Pennings High School in De Pere, Wisconsin in 1973.

He graduated summa cum laude from Dartmouth College in 1977, where he was Editor-in-Chief of The Dartmouth. He was a student of English professor and conservative columnist Jeffrey Hart.

Career
Prior to becoming an editor at The Wall Street Journal, Gigot spent 14 years writing the column "Potomac Watch". His career at the Journal began in 1980, when he became a reporter covering Chicago, Illinois.  Two years later he became the paper's Asia correspondent in Hong Kong.  While in Hong Kong in 1984, Gigot was placed in charge of The Wall Street Journal Asia.

From 1986 to 1987, Gigot served as a White House Fellow under President Ronald Reagan.

During the 1990s, he was a regular guest on The NewsHour with Jim Lehrer, appearing in the program's weekly political analysis segment, opposite Mark Shields, the regular liberal pundit.

In 2000, Gigot won a Pulitzer Prize for his weekly "Potomac Watch" column in The Wall Street Journal, and became the Journals vice president and editorial-page editor in 2001.

Paul Gigot has been described as leading opposition to the 2012 Republican presidential nominee, Mitt Romney, via the editorial pages of The Wall Street Journal.

In 2017, Gigot was alleged to have forced out junior colleague Mark Lasswell from The Wall Street Journal the previous summer, after Lasswell continued to publish op-eds critical of Donald Trump. Gigot refused to comment on the personnel change.

Under Gigot's tenure as editorial page editor and vice president, The Wall Street Journal's editorial page has been criticized by other media and its own reporters for what these critics perceive to be a pro-Trump stance.

Gigot hosts the weekly cable show Journal Editorial Report on Fox News Channel.

Notes

External links
Biography of Gigot on Opinion Journal
January 2005 editorial exhorting Republican policy leadership

Gigot at WisconsinHistory.org

1955 births
Living people
American political writers
American columnists
Pulitzer Prize for Commentary winners
Dartmouth College alumni
American male journalists
Writers from San Antonio
Writers from Green Bay, Wisconsin
The Wall Street Journal people
White House Fellows
Catholics from Texas
Catholics from Wisconsin